Dominik Reinert (born 13 October 1991) is a German footballer who plays for TSV Meerbusch.

References

External links
 

1991 births
Footballers from Duisburg
Living people
German footballers
Association football defenders
MSV Duisburg players
Rot-Weiß Oberhausen players
3. Liga players
Regionalliga players
Oberliga (football) players